Robert Meyers may refer to:

 Robert Meyers (politician) (1914–2007), American politician and judge
 Robert Meyers (ice hockey) (1924–2014), Canadian ice hockey player
 Bob Meyers (journalist), past president of the National Press Foundation

See also
Robert Meyer (disambiguation)
Robert Myers (disambiguation)